Richard Simpson Bird (4 February 1943 – 4 April 2022) was a Supernumerary Fellow of Computation at Lincoln College, University of Oxford, in Oxford England, and former director of the Oxford University Computing Laboratory (now the Department of Computer Science, University of Oxford).

Bird's research interests lay in algorithm design and functional programming, and he was known as a regular contributor to the Journal of Functional Programming and the author of Introduction to Functional Programming using Haskell and other books. His name is associated with the Bird–Meertens formalism, a calculus for deriving programs from specifications in a functional programming style.

Formerly, Bird was at the University of Reading.

He was a member of the International Federation for Information Processing (IFIP) IFIP Working Group 2.1 on Algorithmic Languages and Calculi, which specified, supports, and maintains the programming languages ALGOL 60 and ALGOL 68.

References

External links 
 , laboratory
 
 

1943 births
Living people
English computer scientists
English non-fiction writers
Computer science writers
Members of the Department of Computer Science, University of Oxford
Fellows of Lincoln College, Oxford
Academics of the University of Reading
Programming language researchers
Formal methods people
English male non-fiction writers